Moores Springs is an unincorporated community in Stokes County, North Carolina, United States, approximately five miles west-northwest of Danbury, near Hanging Rock State Park.  It is becoming well known for its mountain biking trails and access to the Dan River.

The Matthew Moore House was added to the National Register of Historic Places in 1974.

References

Unincorporated communities in Stokes County, North Carolina
Unincorporated communities in North Carolina